Edem Ekpat is a village in Etinan local government area of Akwa Ibom State in Nigeria.

References 

Villages in Akwa Ibom